Gao Chongbo (born December 14, 1980 in Qiqihar, Heilongjiang) is a Chinese ice dancer.

He teamed up with Wang Jiayue in 2008. They placed 9th at the 2009 Four Continents Championships

He previously skated with Yang Fang. They were the 2001 & 2003-2005 Chinese national champions. Their highest placement at an ISU championship was 6th at the 2004 Four Continents Championships.

Competitive highlights
(with Gao)

(with Yang)

External links
 
 

1980 births
Living people
Chinese male ice dancers
Sportspeople from Qiqihar
Figure skaters at the 2003 Asian Winter Games
Figure skaters from Heilongjiang